Torodora albicruris is a moth in the family Lecithoceridae. It is found in Taiwan.

The wingspan is 12 mm. The forewings are light brown with a small yellowish white patch and a dark brown discal spot. The hindwings are grey and as wide as the forewings.

Etymology
The name is derived from Latin albus (meaning white) and crus (meaning leg) and refers to the colour of the hind tibia.

References

Moths described in 2000
Torodora